Manduvavaripalem is a small village in Ongole mandal, Prakasam district in the state of Andhra Pradesh, India. The village has become in the limelight as Andhra Pradesh's main opposition Telugu Desam Party (TDP) held its 'Mahandu- 2022' or annual conclave in this village Manduvavaripalem near Ongole on 27 & 28 May 2022.

References

Villages in Prakasam district